Ruckman may refer to:

Ruckman, West Virginia
Ruckman (Australian rules football)
Fort Ruckman, a U.S. Coast Artillery fort located in Nahant, Massachusetts

People 
Ivy Ruckman (born 1931), award-winning author
Peter Ruckman (1921–2016), Baptist minister and King James Only advocate
John Wilson Ruckman (1858–1921), American general
Johan Gustaf Ruckman (1780–1862), Swedish engraver